Badorb.com was a record label created by Alex Paterson of The Orb in 2002.  Though it was an internet label, its releases were vinyl only, which Paterson believed was the reason the label failed and closed in 2003.  It had featured fourteen releases from artists including The Orb, S.E. Berlin and Ayumi Hamasaki.

Releases
BOB 1  S.E. Berlin - Untitled (12")  
BOB 2  Ayumi Hamasaki - Monochrome (12")  
BOB 3  Autolump - Cupa T EP (12")  
BOB 4  Creature - Creature EP (12")  
BOB 4.5  Unknown Artist - Untitled (12")  
BOB 5  Multiverse - Hour Of The Evil Eye EP (12")  
BOB 6  Electric Chairs - Barbie Girl EP (12")  
BOB 7  Prayer Box - Prayer Box EP (12")  
BOB 8  Fusionic - Fusionic EP (12")  
BOB 9  Loophead - Firefly (12")  
BOB 10  Conduit - Snowblind (12")  
BOB 11  Creature - Remixes (12")  
BOB 12  The Orb - Daleth of Elphame EP (12")  
BOB 12CDS  The Orb - Daleth of Elphame EP (CD5")  
BOB 13  Cod Head Cod Head EP (12")  
BOB 14  Takayuki Shiraishi - Pieces EP (12")  
BOBCD 1  Various - Bless You (2xCD)

See also
 List of record labels

References

External links

British record labels
Ambient music record labels
English electronic dance music record labels
Record labels established in 2002
2002 establishments in the United Kingdom
Defunct record labels of the United Kingdom
The Orb